The 1977 Miami Dolphins season was the team's 12th as a member of the National Football League (NFL). The Dolphins improved upon their previous season's output of 6–8, winning ten games. After suffering their first losing season under Coach Don Shula, the Dolphins bounced back to finish 10-4. Bob Griese had a stellar year, despite being forced to wear thick eyeglasses due to a problem with his contacts. Griese, whose season was highlighted by a six touchdown game in St. Louis against the Cardinals, was named Player of the year by the Maxwell Club of Philadelphia. Despite the improvement, the team failed to qualify for the playoffs for the third straight season.

Offseason

NFL Draft

Personnel

Staff

Roster

Schedule 
Dolphins quarterback Bob Griese would throw for six touchdown passes in a Thanksgiving Day match versus the St. Louis Cardinals.  The Dolphins would set a franchise record for most points scored in one game with 55.  Of note, the Dolphins would score eight touchdowns and accumulate 34 first downs.

Note: Intra-division opponents are in bold text.

Results

Week 11 

    
    
    
    
    
    
    
    
    
    

 Bob Griese 15/23, 207 Yds, 6 TD, INT

Standings

Awards and honors 
 Bob Griese, Bert Bell Award

References

External links 
 1977 Miami Dolphins at Pro-Football-Reference.com

Miami Dolphins seasons
Miami Dolphins
Miami Dolphins